Eparchy of Veliko Tarnovo is one of the eparchies of the Bulgarian Orthodox Church in the Bulgaria.

History 
The Eparchy was established after the conversion of the Bulgarians in the time of Saint Boris I of Bulgaria. After 1185 Tarnovo became the centre of the Tarnovo Patriarchate. When the Ottomans conquered Bulgaria Tarnovo Patriarchate decreases in Eparchy of Veliko Tarnovo. The Eparchy were subordinated Ecumenical Patriarchate of Constantinople. The first metropolitan of the Eparchy of Veliko Tarnovo after the Ottoman rule was Ilarion Makariopolski in 1872.

Monasteries

Veliko Tarnovo vicarage 
Arbanassi monastery "Assumption of Virgin. Virgin"
Arbanassi monastery "St. Nikolay"
Kilifarevo Monastery "Nativity of the Virgin"
Kapinovo "St. Nicolas "
Merdanski "St. Forty Martyrs "
Patriarchal Monastery of the Holy Trinity
Plakovski "St. Prophet Elijah "
Transfiguration Monastery
Prisovski "St. Archangel Michael "
Prisovski "St. Panteleimon "

Gorna Oryahovitsa vicarage 
Gornooryahovski "St.. Prophet Elijah "
Lyaskovski "St.St. Peter and Paul "(Peter and Paul Monastery)

Gabrovo vicarage 
Sokolski Monastery

Dryanovo vicarage 
Dryanovo Monastery

Elena vicarage 
Buynyovski "St. Prophet Elijah "
Mariinsky monastery "St. Transfiguration of Our Lord"

Svishtov vicarage 
Svishtov Monastery "St. Ap. Peter and Paul "
Svishtov Monastery "St. Mary "

Sevlievo vicarage 
Batoshevski monastery "Blessed Virgin"
Batoshevski monastery "Dormition of the Mother of God"

Structure 
Veliko Tarnovo spiritual district
Gabrovo spiritual district
Gorna Oryahovitsa spiritual district
Dryanovo spiritual district
Elena spiritual district
Nikopol spiritual district
Pavlikeni spiritual district
Svishtov spiritual district
Sevlievo spiritual district

Bishops
Joseph (Rafailov) (1914-1918)
Philip (Penchev) (1920-1935)
Sofronii (Chavdarov) (1935-1961)
Stefan (Staikov) (1962-1992)
Gregory (Stefanov) (1994-)

References

Bulgarian Orthodox Church
Culture in Veliko Tarnovo